HMCS Spitfire was a 65-ton sail gunboat built at Cuthberts Shipyard, Port Jackson, Australia and launched on 3 April 1855 for the Colony of New South Wales. Her hull was sheathed with 22-ounce copper. She was the first warship built in Australia for a Colonial government. Spitfire was given to the Colony of Queensland in 1859 and she was used as the pilot cutter on Moreton Bay. In 1860, she was used as part of an expedition to find the mouth of the Burdekin River. She was to become the pilot boat for Cooktown, until sold out of service in 1885 and purchased by Captain Alex Mathewson, for use as a fishing vessel. She was sold in 1892 to Dan Moynahan and S.B. Andreassen and during a cyclone in 1896 she was damaged off Hinchinbrook Island.

Fate
Spitfire was sunk during a cyclone off Piper Island Light in December 1899.

Notes

References

1855 ships
Ships built in New South Wales
Gunboats of the New South Wales Naval Brigade